British Cemetery may refer to

Europe
, Belgium
Ancre British Cemetery, France
British Cemetery of Funchal, Madeira, Portugal
British Cemetery Elvas, Portugal
British Cemetery, Lisbon, Portugal
Bilbao British Cemetery, Spain
British Cemetery in Madrid, Spain

South America
Cementerio Británico, Buenos Aires, Argentina
Cemitério dos Ingleses, Gamboa, Rio de Janeiro, Brazil
Cemitério dos Ingleses, Recife, Brazil
British Cemetery of Bahia, Salvador, Brazil
Recoleta Cemetery, Asuncion, Paraguay - section of cemetery known as British Cemetery
British Cemetery, Callao, Peru
The British Cemetery Montevideo, Uruguay

Asia
Sherpur Cantonment, Kabul, Afghanistan
Golaghat British Cemetery, India
Delhi War Cemetery, India

See also 
British Association for Cemeteries in South Asia
English Cemetery (disambiguation)